"Free" is a song recorded by Australian singer-songwriter Pete Murray. It was released in August 2011 as the second single from Murray's fifth studio album, Blue Sky Blue. "Free" peaked at number 42 on the ARIA Singles Chart and was certified gold.

The music video was shot in Brazil and takes the viewer on a visual journey to discover a variety of different meanings behind the word 'free'.

Track listing
 "Free" - 3:35

Charts

Weekly charts

Year-end charts

Certifications

Release history

References
 

2011 singles
2011 songs
Pete Murray (Australian singer-songwriter) songs
Sony Music Australia singles
Songs written by Pete Murray (Australian singer-songwriter)